Danny Briggs (born November 30, 1960) is an American professional golfer who has spent several years on the PGA Tour.

College career
At Texas A&M, Briggs was a three-time All-American and three-time All-Southwest Conference. In 1982, Briggs led the Aggies to the team conference title and a 4th-place finish at the NCAA Championships while finishing as the individual conference champion and 8th place individually in the NCAA. Briggs graduated in 1983.

Professional career
Briggs was a member of the PGA Tour in 1986, 1988, 1999, 2000, 2004, and 2005. Briggs has also spent a large number of years on the Web.com Tour and has played in several Champions Tour events.

His best finish on the PGA Tour was tied for third at the 1986 Tallahassee Open. On the Web.com Tour, he has finished in second place four times: 1993 Nike Tour Championship, 1994 Nike Central Georgia Open, 1995 Nike Inland Empire Open, and 2001 Buy.com Utah Classic

Professional wins (3)
1993 Arizona Open
1995 Arizona Open
1997 Arizona Open

Playoff record
Nike Tour playoff record (0–1)

See also
1985 PGA Tour Qualifying School graduates
1987 PGA Tour Qualifying School graduates
1998 PGA Tour Qualifying School graduates
2003 PGA Tour Qualifying School graduates
2004 PGA Tour Qualifying School graduates

References

External links

American male golfers
Texas A&M Aggies men's golfers
PGA Tour golfers
Golfers from Texas
Sportspeople from Abilene, Texas
People from Franklin, Tennessee
1960 births
Living people